Dolichoderus dajiensis is a species of ant in the genus Dolichoderus. Described by Wang and Zheng in 2005, the species is only known from a mountainous in eastern China, and these specimens at elevations at 930 m (3051 ft).

References

Dolichoderus
Hymenoptera of Asia
Insects of China
Insects described in 2005